Silver City is a community situated between Tulsa and Stillwater in Creek County, Oklahoma, United States, about 10 minutes east of Oilton. It was once a farming and ranching community, though all that remains of the town is one abandoned convenience store, a church, 10 homes, 50 people and a machine shop.

This is not to be confused with the early Indian Territory settlement known as Silver City, which was located to the east of Minco, Oklahoma and north of Tuttle, Oklahoma.

References 

Geography of Creek County, Oklahoma